Kirk Frederick Maltby (born December 22, 1972) is a Canadian former professional ice hockey winger who played 16 seasons in the National Hockey League (NHL) for the Edmonton Oilers and Detroit Red Wings, the latter with whom he won the Stanley Cup four times.

He is currently employed as a professional scout by the Red Wings.

Playing career
Maltby grew up in the town of Hespeler, Ontario and played most of his minor hockey for the Hespeler Shamrocks A club of the OMHA.  As a Midget-aged player, Maltby suited up for the Cambridge Winterhawks Jr.B. club of the OHA in 1988-89. He grew up idolizing Hespeler hockey legend Jim Butler.

After that season, Maltby was a fourth round selection of the Owen Sound Platers in the 1989 OHL Priority Selection.  While in Owen Sound, he played with future NHL'ers Andrew Brunette, Scott Walker, Kevin Weekes and Jamie Storr.

Having spent his junior years with the Owen Sound Platers of the OHL, Maltby was selected in the third round, 65th overall by the Edmonton Oilers in the 1992 Draft.  Maltby spent his entire rookie year at the Cape Breton Oilers of the AHL and played his first NHL season in 1993 playing 68 games and scoring 11 goals and 8 assists for 19 points and 74 penalty minutes.  He played for the Oilers another 2 seasons before moving to the Detroit Red Wings during the 1995–96 NHL season, in which he was traded on March 20 by the Oilers to the Red Wings in exchange for defenceman Dan McGillis.

Maltby spent 14 seasons with the Red Wings, helping them win 4 Stanley Cup titles (1997, 1998, 2002, 2008).  He played on the "Grind Line" with teammates Kris Draper and Darren McCarty and Joe Kocur for a number of years.

Although Maltby was a rather prolific scorer in the Canadian junior leagues, he never netted a 20-goal season nor did he reach 40 points in a season.  Instead, he gained a reputation around the NHL as a solid checking forward and agitator who is able to instigate his opponents into taking a cheap penalty.  As a result, he was named to the Canadian National Team for the 2005 World Championships.  His best statistical season was 2002–03, when he set career highs in goals (14), assists (23), points (37), and penalty minutes (91).

On February 27, 2009, Maltby played in his 1000th career game, in which the Red Wings defeated the Los Angeles Kings 2-1 at Joe Louis Arena in Detroit. Maltby's most recent contract with the Red Wings expired following the 2009-2010 season.

On October 12, 2010, Maltby officially announced his retirement from the NHL. The same day he also announced he will take a job as a pro scout with the Detroit Red Wings.

International play

Maltby has participated in three international tournaments for Canada:
 2003 IIHF World Championship 
 2004 World Cup of Hockey
 2005 IIHF World Championship

Personal life
Kirk Maltby resides in the Grosse Pointe, Michigan area during the season and splits his off-season between his Michigan home and his Hespeler, Ontario residence. He and his wife Wendy  have a daughter named Ella, born March 22, 2004  and fraternal twins: son Landon and daughter Leighton, born July 17, 2008.

Career statistics

Regular season and playoffs

International

References

External links

1972 births
Living people
Canadian ice hockey left wingers
Cape Breton Oilers players
Detroit Red Wings players
Detroit Red Wings scouts
Edmonton Oilers draft picks
Edmonton Oilers players
Ice hockey people from Ontario
Owen Sound Platers players
Sportspeople from Cambridge, Ontario
Sportspeople from Guelph
Stanley Cup champions